Robert Landis Armstrong, known as Bob Armstrong (November 7, 1932 – March 1, 2015), was a Democratic politician and an environmental activist from the U.S. state of Texas. He was a member of the Texas House of Representatives from 1963 to 1971, Commissioner of the General Land Office from 1971 to 1983, and a member of the Texas Parks and Wildlife Commission from 1985 to 1991. From 1993 to 1998, he was the assistant secretary for land and minerals management at the United States Department of the Interior under appointment of U.S. President Bill Clinton.

Early years
Bob Armstrong was the son of the late Robert C. Armstrong and the former Louise Landis. He married the former Linda Lee Aaker, a lobbyist also from Austin.

He received his Bachelor of Arts from the University of Texas and his LL.B. from the University of Texas School of Law, both in his native Austin. While at UT, Armstrong was a member of the service organization known as the Texas Cowboys. He served during the Korean War as an ensign in the United States Navy.

Political career
In 1970, Armstrong was elected the Commissioner of the General Land Office to succeed long-term incumbent Jerry Sadler. He was Land Commissioner for twelve years until 1983. While Land Commissioner he became interested in acquiring the Big Bend Ranch for the State. He was finally able to achieve this in 1988 as a member of the Texas Parks and Wildlife Commission, leading to the creation of Big Bend Ranch State Park.

Armstrong ran for Governor in 1982, losing in the Democratic primary to eventual winner Mark White. In 1985, Governor White appointed Armstrong to the Texas Parks and Wildlife Commission.

President Clinton appointed Armstrong to serve as Assistant Secretary of the Interior for Land and Minerals Management.

Bob Armstrong dip
Armstrong holds a distinction in that he has a dip named after him. Matt's El Rancho restaurant in Austin named a concoction of queso, guacamole, taco meat, and other ingredients "Bob Armstrong dip."On June 28, 2019, El Rancho filed a lawsuit against Horseshoe Hill Cafe, (headquartered in Fort Worth, Texas) citing trademark infringement ~ when Hill Cafe put Bob Armstrong dip on their menu.

References

1932 births
2015 deaths
United States Navy officers
Democratic Party members of the Texas House of Representatives
Commissioners of the General Land Office of Texas
Texas lawyers
University of Texas at Austin alumni
University of Texas School of Law alumni
Politicians from Austin, Texas
American environmentalists
Burials at Texas State Cemetery
Activists from Texas
20th-century American lawyers
Military personnel from Texas